Secamonoideae is a subfamily of the dogbane family, Apocynaceae.

Genera
Calyptranthera Klack., 1996
Genianthus Hook. f., 1883
Goniostemma Wight, 1834
Pervillaea Decne., 1844
Secamone R. Br., 1810
Secamonopsis Jum., 1908
Toxocarpus Wight & Arn., 1834
Trichosandra Decne., 1844

References

 
Gentianales subfamilies